Mitaka may refer to:

 Mitaka, Tokyo, a city in Japan
 Mitaka Station, a railway station
 1088 Mitaka, an asteroid
 Mitaka people, an indigenous ethnic group of Australia
 Shun Mitaka, a fictional character in the Maison Ikkoku manga series

See also 
 Mithaka